SONO 50 (also known as the SoNo Corporate Center) is an office building in Norwalk, Connecticut in the modernist style.

Renovation 
When Capital Equities Group acquired the building in 2014, work commenced on modernizing and upgrading the building's interior and exterior. Renovations included a new lobby, fitness center, and a repainting of the exterior facade. The building was generally considered an eyesore by the public, the original facade was a white color. In hopes of improving the aesthetics of the building, the exterior walls were painted over to grey in 2019, finishing the renovation process.

See also
 SoNo Collection

References

Office buildings in Connecticut
Office buildings completed in 1970